In combat sports such as boxing, an orthodox stance is one in which the boxer places their left foot in front of the right foot, thus having their weaker side closer to the opponent. Because it favors the stronger, dominant side (often the right side; see laterality), the orthodox stance is the most common stance in boxing and MMA. It is mostly used by right-handed boxers. Many boxing champions have fought in a left  stance.

Alternative stances 
The corresponding designation for a left-handed boxer is southpaw and is generally a mirror image of the orthodox stance. A southpaw boxer guards and jabs with their right hand. Some famous boxers who use southpaw are Marvelous Marvin Hagler,   Victor Ortiz, Sultan Ibragimov, Naseem Hamed, Joe Calzaghe, Manny Pacquiao, and Lucian Bute. Francisco Palacios, Andre Ward, and Terence Crawford normally fight as orthodox, but occasionally switch to a southpaw stance to confuse their opponents. Hagler was the opposite, normally fighting southpaw but able to switch to orthodox. Some fighters who are naturally left-handed fight in the orthodox stance with the advantage of a fast, hard jab and left hook, including Oscar De La Hoya, Sonny Liston, Miguel Angel Cotto, Gerry Cooney, and Marco Antonio Barrera. Likewise, Vasiliy Lomachenko is a naturally right-handed fighter who stands in the southpaw stance, as the same with Shakur Stevenson.

References

External links
 
 
 
 
 

Boxing terminology
Kickboxing terminology